Wild Cargo may refer to:

 Wild Cargo (film), a 1934 jungle adventure documentary 
 Wild Cargo (book), a 1932 book by Frank Buck